Antiviral Chemistry & Chemotherapy is a peer-reviewed academic journal published bimonthly by International Medical Press. It was established in January 1990 and published by Blackwell Publishing until 1997. The editor-in-chief is Hugh J. Field (University of Cambridge). The journal covers research on all aspects of the preclinical development of antiviral drugs, including their chemical synthesis, biochemistry, pharmacology, mode of action, and virology, as well as studies in animal models. The journal is an official publication of the International Society for Antiviral Research.

Abstracting and indexing 
The journal is abstracted and indexed in Index Medicus/Medline, Research Alert, Chemical Abstracts, and Excerpta Medica/EMBASE.

See also 
 Antiviral Therapy

References

External links 
 

Microbiology journals
Delayed open access journals
Publications established in 1990
Pharmacology journals
Bimonthly journals
English-language journals